The Minsk Metro is a rapid transit system that serves Minsk, the capital of Belarus. Opened in 1984, it presently consists of 3 lines and 33 stations, totaling . In 2013, the system carried 328.3 million passengers, which averages to a daily ridership of approximately 899,450.

History
During the 1950s–1970s the population of the city grew to over a million and designs for a rapid transit system were initially proposed during the late 1960s. Construction began on 3 May 1977, and the system was opened to the public on 30 June 1984, becoming the ninth metro system in the Soviet Union.

Despite the dissolution of the Soviet Union the construction of the Minsk metro continued uninterrupted throughout the 1990s (as opposed to other ex-Soviet Metros like those of Yerevan and Samara, which were halted due to a complete lack of funding). Some experts attribute it to the slow reform of the Soviet planned economy in Belarus, which turned out to be beneficial for metro expansion. For example, the final phase of the Aŭtazavodskaja Line (Avtazavodskaya Line), originally planned for 2006, was opened in late 2005, and similarly the northern extension of the Maskoŭskaja Line (Moskovskaya Line), originally scheduled for 2008, opened on 7 November 2007. In November 2012 three new stations opened on the southern end of the Maskoŭskaja line (Instytut Kuĺtury - Piatroŭščyna) and in June 2014 the line was expanded in the south part with 1 more new station (Piatroŭščyna - Malinaŭka).        

Construction of the 1st phase of the new Line 3 (Zielienalužskaja Line) started in 2014 which consisted of 4 new stations running from Jubiliejnaja Plošča to Kavaĺskaja slabada station. The 1st phase opened on 6 November 2020. The 2nd phase is being constructed since 2018 with an estimated opening in 2023 which contains the extension from Kavaĺskaja slabada to Slucki Hasciniec stations (3 new stations) with 1 depot being built in the new south terminal station of the line.

Timeline

Operational characteristics
The city is located on an almost level surface and on very dry soils. As a result, although all of the Minsk Metro stations are under the surface, there are no deep-level stations that are found in most of the ex-Soviet cities. Out of the current 33 stations 19 are pillar-spans and 10 are of vaulted type. Like most of the Soviet metro systems, all of the stations are vividly decorated. Some (notably, Niamiha) exhibit Belarusian national motifs, while others focus on more Soviet socialist themes, although recent years have seen more priority on high-tech decorations.

Signs and announcements in the metro system are in Belarusian and English.

Expansion plans

Construction of a third line, the Zielienalužskaja (Zelenaluzhskaya) line (shown in green), began in 2014. When fully completed, this line will run from the south to the northeast of the city via the centre, creating two new transfer points with the existing lines. 

The first stage of the line was opened on 7 November 2020 running from Jubiliejnaja Plošča to Kavaĺskaja slabada station. This follows a northern contour parallel to Maskoŭskaja (Moskovskaya) which has since relieved the extensive congestion in the city area with 2 interchange stations at Vakzaĺnaja (Plošča Lienina station of Line 1) and Jubiliejnaja Plošča station (Frunzienskaja station of Line 2). 

As of November 2020, the Zielienalužskaja line consists of four stations. While Line 3 is planned to be extended north to the residential area of Zialiony Luh, a southern extension to Slucki Hasciniec with 3 new stations and 1 depot of Line 3 is under construction (estimated opening in 2023).

A planned fourth (circle) line is expected to connect south and north parts of the city which are densely populated. This line is planned to have a length of 37 kilometres with 1 new depot serving the line and 17 new stations of which 6 stations are going to be interchange stations. Specifically, Line 4 will interchange at Michalova and Akademija navuk stations of Line 1, Traktarny zavod and Puškinskaja stations of Line 2 and future Plošča Banhalor and Aerodromnaja stations of Line 3.

Two extensions of Line 1 and two of Line 2 (4 in total) with 2 new stations for Line 1 and 2 respectively were mentioned but never went into additional consideration as the construction of Line 3 and the plans for Line 4 keep their priority low. These expansions were specifically mentioned as:

Line 1:
Malinaŭka – Ščomyslica and 
Uručča – Smalienskaja

Line 2:
Kamiennaja Horka – Čyrvony Bor and
Mahilioŭskaja – Šabany

Incidents

1999 stampede

On 30 May 1999, a sudden thunderstorm caused a large crowd, from a nearby rock concert, to seek shelter at the Niamiha station. The limited size of the underpass leading into the ticket hall and the wet pavement caused a human crush. Fifty-three people died.

2011 bombing

The Kastryčnickaja station was the site of a terrorist bombing on 11 April 2011. Fifteen people were killed.

Lines and stations

Map

Maskoŭskaja line

Aŭtazavodskaja line

Zielienalužskaja line

Rolling stock

See also
 List of metro systems

References

External links 

 Minsk Metro – official site
 Official City of Minsk Urban Transport site
 The site of the Minsk subway Minsk-Metro.NET (unofficial)
 Minsk at UrbanRail.net
 Site by Andrey Kharchevk
 Popular site
 Another Popular site
 Network map

 
Railway lines opened in 1984
Underground rapid transit in Belarus